Banchory St. Ternan Football Club are a Scottish Junior football club based in Crathes, two miles outside the town of Banchory, Aberdeenshire. The club were formed in 1992 after an amalgamation of two local amateur teams, Banchory Amateurs and St. Ternan Amateurs, and joined the Scottish Junior Football Association, North Region in 1993. The club colours are royal blue and white.

The team are managed since August 2020 by Anton Lennox.

Honours
 North Region First Division winners: 2018–19
 North Region Division One winners: 2007–08
 Morrison Trophy winners: 1994–95, 1995–96, 2004–05, 2005–06, 2018–19

References

External links
 New Club website
 Old Club website
 Scottish Football Historical Archive
 Non-League Scotland

Football clubs in Scotland
Scottish Junior Football Association clubs
Association football clubs established in 1992
Football in Aberdeenshire
1992 establishments in Scotland